Nizhneatamanskoye is a rural locality (a selo) in Starooskolsky District, Belgorod Oblast, Russia. The population was 156 as of 2010. There are 9 streets.

Geography 
Nizhneatamanskoye is located 12 km south of Stary Oskol (the district's administrative centre) by road. Sorokino is the nearest rural locality.

References 

Rural localities in Starooskolsky District